Åland United is a Finnish women's football club based in Lemland, Åland. They compete in the Kansallinen Liiga, the premier women's football league in Finland.

In 2004 Åland's clubs Lemlands IF and IF Finströms Kamraterna decided to strengthen the women's football in the region. Their combined team operated under Lemlands IF using name Åland United. United managed promotion to the top national women's league, the Naisten Liiga, in 2005. In 2008 other Ålandic clubs Sunds IF, IFK Mariehamn and Saltviks IF joined in the cooperation and Åland United became an independent, pure women's football club.

In 2009 Åland United won the championship and played in the 2010–11 UEFA Women's Champions League. They started in the round of 32 and lost both legs to reigning champion Turbine Potsdam. In subsequent seasons Åland United has been 3rd (2010), 4th (2011), 2nd (2012) and champions (2013)

Titles
 Finnish League champions: 2009, 2013
 Finnish Women's Cup : 2020

Current squad

References

External links
 Club's website

 
Football in Åland
Women's football clubs in Finland
2004 establishments in Finland
Association football clubs established in 2004